Arenimonas malthae is a Gram-negative and rod-shaped bacterium from the genus of Arenimonas which has been isolated from diesel-oil contaminated soil frpm Chiayi County in Taiwan.

References

Xanthomonadales
Bacteria described in 2007